Simon Charles Dickie (31 March 1951 – 13 December 2017) was a New Zealand rowing cox who won three Olympic medals.

Dickie was born in 1951 in Waverley in Taranaki, New Zealand. He was educated at Wanganui Collegiate School where he was part of the Maadi Cup winning crews between 1966 and 1968. For the 1968 Summer Olympics, New Zealand qualified an eight and had a pool of four rowers and a cox as a travelling reserve; Dickie was part of this reserve as their cox. Preparations were held in Christchurch at Kerr's Reach on the Avon River. The reserve rowers were unhappy with the "spare parts" tag and felt that they were good enough to perhaps win a medal if put forward as a coxed four. The trainer, Rusty Robertson, commented about them that they were "the funniest looking crew you've ever seen". There were stern discussions with the New Zealand selectors. In a training run, the coxed four was leading fours formed from the eight over the whole race. In the end, the reserve rowers got their way and New Zealand entered both the coxed four and the coxed eight. Dickie won the Olympic coxed four event along with Dick Joyce, Dudley Storey, Ross Collinge and Warren Cole; this was New Zealand's first gold medal in rowing. At the time, he was a 17-year-old schoolboy at Wanganui Collegiate, called in to replace a previous cox who had been killed in a training accident. The crew's winning boat was later sold to a rowing club to recoup costs, and ended up in splinters after a road crash.

Dickie was part of the eight that was formed for the 1971 rowing season; he teamed up with Dick Joyce, Tony Hurt, Wybo Veldman, John Hunter, Lindsay Wilson, Joe Earl, Trevor Coker and Gary Robertson. They won gold at the 1971 European Rowing Championships, defeating the favourite team from East Germany. The New Zealand eight would go on in unchanged composition to with the 1972 Olympic eight event where they again won gold. At the 1976 Summer Olympics in Montreal he was again cox for the eight which this time won the bronze medal. His crewmates this time were Tony Hurt, Alec McLean, Ivan Sutherland, Trevor Coker, Peter Dignan, Lindsay Wilson, Joe Earl and Dave Rodger.

Dickie is one of only fifteen New Zealanders to have won two or more Olympic gold medals. He later owned an adventure company in Taupō.

Death
He died at his house in Taupō on 13 December 2017 aged 66. The day before his death he had held a reunion for the 1968 coxed four, and he was involved in organising a reunion for the 1972 coxed eight at the next Halberg Awards function.

References

External links
 
 

1951 births
2017 deaths
Olympic gold medalists for New Zealand in rowing
Olympic bronze medalists for New Zealand
Rowers at the 1968 Summer Olympics
Rowers at the 1972 Summer Olympics
Rowers at the 1976 Summer Olympics
New Zealand male rowers
World Rowing Championships medalists for New Zealand
Medalists at the 1976 Summer Olympics
Medalists at the 1972 Summer Olympics
Medalists at the 1968 Summer Olympics
Coxswains (rowing)
People educated at Whanganui Collegiate School
European Rowing Championships medalists
People from Taranaki